George Feigley (June 23, 1940 – April 13, 2009) was an American church leader. He has been described as a sex cult leader. Feigley served over 32 years in prison for sex crimes against children, from 1975 to 2008.

In 1971, Feigley founded an organization he called the Neo American Church (not be confused with the more notable and unrelated Neo-American Church, a psychedelian religion founded by Arthur Kleps in the mid 1960s) and the associated Neo American School. The church and school were located in Harrisburg, Pennsylvania.

Church doctrine emphasized the transcendent or mystical power of orgasm. According to police reports, it also advocated the use of children for sexual gratification. While leading the cult, Feigley authored several publications under the pseudonym G.G. Stoctay. These included a book entitled The Sale of Lillian, which described the sexual abuse of a 10-year-old girl, and contained graphic illustrations of such abuse.

The charismatic Feigley, who called himself "The Light of the World", gathered a small group of followers, mostly women, into his church. As of 1983, the group, which at one point had numbered over twenty persons, included about ten adults, one or two of whom were men (five children of group members were then living in foster homes where they had been placed by the state).

Imprisonment, escape, and re-capture
Feigley led the church in freedom for only about five years, as he was arrested in 1975 on multiple counts of statutory rape, indecent assault, and corrupting the morals of minors. He was found guilty of statutory rape of two teenage girls and was sentenced to 10 years to 20 years in prison. His wife was found guilty of corrupting the morals of minors.

Notwithstanding his imprisonment, some of Feigley's followers remained loyal, roaming to follow him as he was moved from prison to prison or when he was a fugitive.

In 1976, Feigley scaled a prison wall at SCI- Rockview and fled to West Virginia. While he was on the lam he hid at a farm near Thornton, West Virginia, which he and his followers referred to as the "Aaron Farm". He was apprehended in 1978, but escaped from the Taylor County Jail in Grafton less than a month later while awaiting extradition back to Pennsylvania. He was assisted in this escape by fellow prisoner James Lee Gilbert, who joined the cult after engineering the escape. After his second escape he was free for two months before he was recaptured, hiding on another farm near Sneedville, Tennessee.

In 1981, plans for Feigley to escape from SCI- Graterford by helicopter were uncovered. In response Feigley was transferred to Western Penitentiary.

His women followers visited him regularly at the State Correctional Institution at Huntingdon, Pennsylvania. The organization continued to operate; a 1983 raid on Feigley's home found young children playing with sex toys and boxes of child pornography. Feigley's wife and others pleaded guilty to corruption of minors and were sentenced to prison.

In 1983, James Lee Gilbert and another of Feigley's followers, Laura Seligman, died in circumstances that led authorities to believe they were intending to break Feigley out of prison. (They drowned in a sewer line close to Western Penitentiary where Feigley was then held.)

In 1994, while still in prison, Feigley was convicted of instructing his wife and another man over a prison phone to rape a 14-year-old girl. Feigley was found guilty of conspiracy to commit involuntary deviate sexual intercourse and sentenced. Because of problems with the search warrants, Feigley's wife and the girl's mother were able to plead guilty and receive probation.

Prisoner activism 
In 1996, while imprisoned, Feigley co-founded the prisoners' advocacy website and non-profit corporation www.prisoners.com, along with his wife Sandra. He contributed to the website to the extent possible while he was in prison. Www.prisoners.com purported to be "The Voice of the Imprisoned" and criticized the Pennsylvania Department of Corrections for alleged abuses. It also provided information useful to prisoners and their loved ones.

The website also featured biographies of and works of art by prisoners, and health essays by Feigley under the pseudonym "Professor Stoctay". However in addition to this advocacy for prisoners, Prisoners.com also published some of Feigley's rationalizations for his crimes. As of April 2019, the website is defunct.

Release
Feigley became eligible for parole in 1990, but parole was denied then and at each subsequent annual review. Having served the full time for all his convictions, Feigley was released from prison on August 15, 2008, to some consternation. His convictions were not covered under Pennsylvania's Megan's Laws (his 1976 conviction preceded Megan's Law, and conspiracy to commit involuntary deviate sexual intercourse — his 1994 charge — isn't covered under the law), so he was not required to register as a sex offender, nor was he on parole as he had served his sentences in full.

His return home was met with a crowd of protestors. A neighbor circulated a petition to prevent Feigley's return to his home.

Death 
Feigley, who left prison in poor health, died on April 13, 2009.

See also
List of prison escapes
List of helicopter prison escapes

References

1940 births
2009 deaths
20th-century American criminals
American escapees
American rapists
American people convicted of child sexual abuse
American people convicted of indecent assault
American people convicted of rape
People from Harrisburg, Pennsylvania
Prisoners and detainees of Pennsylvania
Religious figures convicted of child sexual abuse